Sequanium was the proposed name for a new element found by the Romanian physicist Horia Hulubei in 1939. The name derived from the Latin word Sequana for the river Seine running through Paris where Hulubei worked at that time.

Hulubei thought he had discovered element 93 in a tantalite sample from the French region Haute-Vienne. The element 93 was synthesised in 1940 and named neptunium. It does in fact occur in nature in trace amounts, but it's not commonly believed that Hulubei actually discovered it.

References

Misidentified chemical elements
Neptunium